Sleepy Creek is a  tributary of the Potomac River in the United States, belonging to the Chesapeake Bay's watershed. The stream rises in Frederick County, Virginia, and flows through Morgan County, West Virginia before joining the Potomac near the community of Sleepy Creek.

While Sleepy Creek Lake is a part of the Sleepy Creek watershed, it is an impoundment of its tributary, Meadow Branch, in Berkeley County, West Virginia and not of Sleepy Creek itself.

Course
Sleepy Creek's source lies north of State Route 127 in Frederick County, Virginia, near the Hampshire County, West Virginia border at Good. From Frederick County, Sleepy Creek flows north through Morgan County, West Virginia, where it drains into the Potomac at the community of Sleepy Creek on the old Baltimore & Ohio Railroad mainline.

Tributaries
Tributary streams listed from south (source) to north (mouth).

Bear Garden Run
Hands Run
Breakneck Run
Indian Run
South Fork Indian Run
Middle Fork Indian Run
North Fork Indian Run
Rock Gap Run
Middle Fork Sleepy Creek
Iden Run
South Fork Sleepy Creek
Merchant Run
Mountain Run
Yellow Spring Run
Meadow Branch

Bridges

Cities and towns along Sleepy Creek

Good
Johnsons Mill
New Hope
Omps
Ridge
Sleepy Creek
Smith Crossroads
Spohrs Crossroads
Stotlers Crossroads

See also 
List of West Virginia rivers
List of Virginia rivers
Sleepy Creek Wildlife Management Area

References

External links
Sleepy Creek Watershed Association

Rivers of Frederick County, Virginia
Rivers of Morgan County, West Virginia
Rivers of Virginia
Rivers of West Virginia
Tributaries of the Potomac River